Jean Goldschmit (20 February 1924 – 14 February 1994) was a professional Luxembourgian road bicycle racer. He was professional from 1946 to 1953 and had 14 victories which included two stage wins and wearing the yellow jersey as leader of the general classification in the Tour de France for three stages. Other wins included cyclo-cross champion of Luxembourg in 1946 and 1947 and road race champion of Luxembourg in 1947 and 1950.

Major results

1945
Tour de Luxembourg
1946
 national cyclo-cross championship
1947
 national cyclo-cross championship
 national road race championship
1948
Tour de Luxembourg
1949
Tour de France:
8th place overall classification
Winner stage 14
1950
 national road race championship
Tour de France:
10th place overall classification
Winner stage 1
Wearing yellow jersey for three days
Paris-Metz

References

External links 

Official Tour de France results for Jean Goldschmit

1924 births
1994 deaths
Luxembourgian male cyclists
Luxembourgian Tour de France stage winners
Sportspeople from Luxembourg City
Tour de Suisse stage winners